PORTARO was the name of a Portuguese 4WD offroad utility vehicle which was based on the earlier Romanian original ARO 24 Series 4X4 model produced under license in Portugal. PORTARO 4WD models were made between 1975 until 1995. The PORTARO name was an acronym of PORT for Portugal + ARO the Romanian main manufacturer of original offroad vehicles.

History

The PORTARO 4X4 was manufactured from imported original ARO original parts in CKD form produced in Romania destined for final assembly here by the SEMAL company in Setúbal Portugal starting in 1975 by the entrepreneur and industrialist Hipólito Pires with help from a business partner José Megre and a mechanical engineer Costa Freitas all three quickly became business partners at the SEMAL Industrial Complex who started the PORTARO project shortly after. The soon very successful PORTARO was a much improved derivative version from the original ARO 240 4WD Series from the 1970s looking very similar in concept and style to the British worldwide famous Landrover brand name but using an original Romanian cross country standard iron chassis and many parts, instead of industrial aluminium.

After the first original model called the PORTARO 240 2500 4X4 which was a very basic offroad vehicle much like an early 1970s Landrover 88D SWB 4X4 but powered by an original Daihatsu Diesel 2530cc running gear sales were instant as there was no other new domestic rival at the time, save for the unique well known Landrover a brand name available for sale since the early 1960s in Portugal. The brand name PORTARO 4X4 appeared in 1975 and came in two main versions: The PORTARO 4X4200 Series an offroad utility jeep and later in 1977 the PORTARO Campina 4X4 the 300 Series very useful a pick up truck version both models enjoying healthy sales in the 1970s and the 1980s with few equivalent rivals to match at their time with its own new original Model Range quickly being offered to potential owners.

Most of the PORTARO 4X4 vehicles produced were originally fitted with Daihatsu Diesel 2500cc and 2800cc engined 4WD models like the 240, 250, 260, 280 followed by the 4WD pick up models Campina 280L, 320 and 350 Super. However in addition to several other new 4WD prototypes, two very interesting authentic PORTARO models were also manufactured this time powered by original Volvo Petol 2127cc and 2296cc powerful running gear similar to those used in the original Volvo 240 Series cars at the time, although these were always sold in much smaller numbers intended for general Motor Sports Events like local offroad motor racing and rally racing occurring frequently in the 1980s. By 1982 the SEMAL company were assembling extra two more brand new PORTARO 4X4 versions called the 210 PT TURBO 4WD and 230 PV 4WD 2300 both are very rare petrol engined models that were much less popular though the lighter 230 PV 4WD soon turned into the most successful and the most powerful Portuguese made vehicle ever in offroad racing.

Model Range 
This is a complete list of all the original GV-SEMAL brand, makers of the TAGUS and the PORTARO Model Range of 4X4 vehicles manufactured 1975-1995 including the models later produced by the FMAT company.

GV SEMAL TAGUS 4WD Model Range
(Made 1976 to about 1986 all based on the original Romanian ROCAR TV 4WD model all are fitted with the Daihatsu Diesel 2530cc 76 BHP engine around 5000 units were produced in total)
TAGUS GV 250 DIESEL 2500 4X4 Furgão (A Van three-seater model)
TAGUS GV 250 DIESEL 2500 4X4 Misto (A six-seater combi-van)
TAGUS GV 250 DIESEL 2500 4x4 Pickup (A three-seater truck)
TAGUS GV 250 DIESEL 2500 4X4 Ambulance
TAGUS GV 250 DIESEL 2500 4X4 Chassis Truck
TAGUS GV 250 DIESEL 2500 4X4 Fire Engine
TAGUS GV 250 DIESEL 2500 4X4 Military Truck
TAGUS GV 250 DIESEL 2500 4X4 Minibus

GV SEMAL PORTARO 4WD Model Range
(From 1975 the original offroad models started production at the SEMAL factory in industrial Setubal later production moving northeast to the FMAT factory at Tramagal ending here in 1995)
PORTARO 230PV 4X4 Rally (A light rally racing model used in the famous gruelling 1983 Paris-Dakar Rallye Event quickly became a winner.)
PORTARO 230PVCM 4X4 Funcar (Same as above but more of a roofless offroad leisure type funcar.)
PORTARO 230PVP 4X4 Pickup Petrol (Same as above but with factory welded cargo box behind the 3 seater cab.)
PORTARO 240D Diesel 4X4 (The very first PORTARO offroad jeep with Daihatsu DG30 2530cc diesel engine launched in 1975.)
PORTARO 240D Diesel 4X4 Pickup (Same as above, it was a 3-seater cab useful pickup truck.)
PORTARO 240D Diesel 4X4 Furgão (A three-seater basic closed offroad Van model.)
PORTARO 240D Diesel 4X4 Especial (A forestry work/armytruck model fitted with winch, large tyres and other extras for specialized roles)
PORTARO 250DGL Diesel (The only Portaro model without 4X4 axles instead has just RWD only, about 1000 or so of these were made.)
PORTARO 250 FMAT ID Diesel 4X4 (The last new known Portaro 4X4 model available for the 1990s with modern Ford Transit mechanicals and parts)
PORTARO 260D Diesel 4X4 Cabriolet Especial (A Convertible jeep with new engine & new gearbox, and several luxury items.)
PORTARO 260D Diesel 4X4 Jipe (Same as above with new Daihatsu running gear, new suspension, removable rooftop & parts.)
PORTARO 260D Diesel 4X4 Pickup (Same as above, a pickup truck model, with new 3 seater cab and new redesigned interior.)
PORTARO 260DCM Diesel 4X4 Furgão (As above but has a redesigned interior, improved construction and new components.)
PORTARO 280DCM Diesel 4X4 Jipe (Another new model nine seater now using new Daihatsu 2800cc Diesel & optional 2800cc Turbodiesel engines.)
PORTARO 280DCM Diesel 4X4 Ambulance (As above but with a new 5 speed gearbox and improved 3 range offroad transfer case.)
PORTARO 280DCM Diesel 4X4 Furgão (A 3-seater van bodied model powered by modern Daihatsu 2800 mechanicals.)
PORTARO 280DCM Diesel 4X4 Bombeiros (Popular model to carry firemen and their firefighting equipment of which several hundred of these were ordered) 

Also at the large FMAT factory complex any potential customer to Special Order could choose the current original Daihatsu TURBODIESEL 2800cc 117 bhp running gear to be supplied to any of the then original PORTARO 280 4WD Series similar to those as used in the popular DAIHATSU Delta lorries, Rocky, Taft and Wildcat 4WD models. 

PORTARO CAMPINA 280L Diesel 4X4 Pickup truck (An 1980s new pickup truck fitted with modern Daihatsu Diesel 2785cc running gear )  
PORTARO CAMPINA 320 Diesel 4X4 Pickup truck (Originally made in the late 1970s a very popular model with Daihatsu Diesel 2530cc mechanicals)
PORTARO CAMPINA 350 Super Diesel 4X4 Pickup truck (A restyled model with new interior, new independent suspension and new longer chassis.)
PORTARO CELTA 210PT TURBO 4X4 (A kind of a Range Rover 4X4 luxury model and now very rare with Volvo BE2120 Turbocharged petrol car engine.) 
PORTARO CELTA 260 TURBODIESEL 4X4 (Another rare Range Rover type 4X4 luxury jeep powered by Daihatsu Turbo Diesel 2530cc 96 BHP engine.)
PORTARO CELTA 280DCM Diesel (From the 1990s a regular nine-seater 4X4 model.)
PORTARO CELTA 280DCM Cabriolet (From the 1990s A Hardtop removable roof Convertible model)
PORTARO PAMPAS 260 Diesel 4X4 (For Export only with standard RHD for the UK Market)
PORTARO PAMPAS 260DP Diesel 4X4 Pickup (For Export only with standard RHD for the UK Market)
PORTARO JIPE 1984 Diesel 4X4 (Single white prototype made was a new 3 to 9 passenger model but sadly never produced)
PORTARO NATO GVM Diesel 4X4 (Single prototype Military new model but never produced) 

By 1990 the original company who assembled PORTARO 4X4 offroad vehicles SEMAL sold the production rights, the tradename and all the spares parts stocks to the FMAT company at Tramagal an industrial town east of Lisbon next the Tagus river in rural Santarem who have been making agricultural equipment and industrial machinery since the 1920s. Motor vehicle assembly became a weekly operation at FMAT so output production had quadrupled than it was before making PORTARO brand name once more relaunched to the market after a brief absence but with a reduced new PORTARO Model Range by the 1980s. This unrestored basic grey 1989 PORTARO 280 DCM 2800 4WD Diesel nine seater as shown in this photograph was actually assembled at the FMAT manufacturing facility in the 1980s one of about 500 units of this model produced there this particular example was awaiting restoration owned by the author of this PORTARO article and pages.

During the 1990s the Portuguese New Automobile Market the PORTARO brand name was facing a stiff competition with many other offroad vehicles and other 4WD manufacturers offering much better prices while others sold superior models too so their sales dwindled slightly and UMM 4X4 the other domestic manufacturer of similar nature were also facing similar situations but at least UMM brand name still sold well. Therefore the FMAT company decided at the time to reduce some of their original PORTARO model range due to the economical and financial unrest at the time of the 1990s in Europe particularly in Portugal but unfortunately most of the spare parts were running low forcing FMAT to redesign their own PORTARO model range assembling vehicles this time fitting them with new FORD Transit TDI 2500cc running gear with higher torque and more powerful engines needed for these large vehicles which became the PORTARO 250 FMAT ID 4X4 however sales took a downturn in about 1994 and to make matters worse the stocked ARO original spare parts were running low too in the assembly workshops forcing to a reduced production of the historic PORTARO brand name so it was inevitable that FMAT could not handle this situation any longer  and by 1995 marking the end of the PORTARO Portuguese brand name almost thirty years after it arrived upon the scene in the automobile market often with happy sales.

See also
 Auverland
 Cournil
 UMM
 Paris-Dakar Rallye

References
ACP & AUTOMOTOR (Monthly Automobile Magazines)

PORTARO Original Page on Facebook (In Portuguese)

Rodas De Viriato Official Website (A-Z Of Portuguese Motorvehicle Brands)

External links

 GTÜ Official site 
 Internetseite with Photos (Portuguese)

Car manufacturers of Portugal
Defunct companies of Portugal